Christophe Blanchet (born 9 April 1973) is a French politician of La République En Marche! (LREM) who has been serving as a member of the French National Assembly, representing the 4th constituency of Calvados.

In Parliament, Blanchet serves on the Defense Committee. In addition to his committee assignments, he is a member of the French-Paraguayan Parliamentary Friendship Group.

In late 2019, Blanchet was one of 17 members of the Defense Committee who co-signed a letter to Prime Minister Édouard Philippe in which they warned that the 365 million euro ($406 million) sale of aerospace firm Groupe Latécoère to U.S. fund Searchlight Capital raised “questions about the preservation of know-how and France’s defense industry base” and urged government intervention.

In late 2020, Blanchet left the LREM group and instead joined the MoDem group.

See also
 French legislative elections 2017

References

1973 births
Living people
Deputies of the 15th National Assembly of the French Fifth Republic
Deputies of the 16th National Assembly of the French Fifth Republic
Democratic Movement (France) politicians
La République En Marche! politicians
Politicians from Caen